The minister of innovation, science, and industry is the minister of the Crown in the Canadian Cabinet who is responsible for overseeing the economic development and corporate affairs department of the Government of Canada; Innovation, Science and Economic Development Canada.

The minister of innovation, science and industry is also the minister responsible for Statistics Canada. By convention, the minister of innovation, science and industry also serves as the registrar general of Canada.

The current minister of innovation, science and industry is François-Philippe Champagne.

History

The first century of Canada
The office of the registrar general of Canada has traditionally been associated with the responsibility of overseeing corporate affairs, by virtue of its function in registering all letters patent. From Confederation to 1966, the secretary of state for Canada was the registrar general. Between 1966 and 1995, the office was held by the minister of consumer and corporate affairs.

The National Research Council of Canada was established in 1916, under the pressure of World War I, to advise the government on matters of science and industrial research. In 1932, laboratories were built on Sussex Drive in Ottawa.

The economic development function of the portfolio can be traced from the office of Minister of Trade and Commerce, which was created in 1892. The post of Minister of Industry briefly existed between 1963 and 1969 as a successor to the post of Minister of Defence Production. It was merged with the trade and commerce portfolio in 1969. The post of Minister of Industry, Trade and Commerce existed between 1969 and 1983. During that time, separate posts of Minister of Regional Economic Expansion (1969 to 1983) and Minister of Regional Industrial Expansion (1983–1990) also existed. In 1990, the post of Minister of Industry, Science and Technology was created.

University funding was a problem for the Government of Canada over the first three-quarters of the 20th century. In 1967 the passage of the Federal-Provincial Fiscal Arrangements Act (FPFAA) replaced the policy of direct federal grants to the universities with a system of transfers to the provincial governments to support the operating costs of universities, which are a provincial responsibility under the 1867 British North America Act.

Over the course of seven years from 1970, the so-called Lamontagne Report on A Science Policy for Canada detailed the work of the Senate Special Committee on Science Policy. Several avenues were investigated by the Canadian Cabinet, including the nomination of the Royal Society of Canada as the exclusive distributor of federal "governmental science and technology contract services" funds for post-secondary education, in a "national academy of science" type arrangement but this avenue was rejected because of the provincial responsibility factor.

The 1977 GOSA Act
In 1977 the funding of university research in Canada was formally separated from the NRC, under the Established Programs Financing Act and the Government Organization (Scientific Activities) Act, 1976 (GOSA Act). Several legally-distinct bodies were created to disburse federal government monies: the Social Sciences and Humanities Research Council, the Canada Council, the Natural Sciences and Engineering Research Council, the National Research Council, the Defence Research Board, the Medical Research Council (latterly renamed to the Canadian Institutes of Health Research) and the National Library of Canada each nurture the related trade. Of these bodies, the first, third, fourth, fifth and sixth report to the Minister of Innovation. The government provides subsidy (the major source of federal government funding to post-secondary research) and the scientists look after the details. The first, third and sixth bodies are sometimes collectively referred to as the "Tri-Council" or "Tri-Agency". The effect of the GOSA Act was dramatic, as reported by Rogers and McLean: "since 1979-80, federal support for self-initiated, non-contractual research in education has increased from C$126,000 to more than C$1.7 million" in 1986.

The present system grants directly to faculty members for research projects under such policies as the Canada Research Chair programme, and provides capital funds on a "shared-cost basis" for large infrastructure projects, such as buildings or laboratories. Fisher and Rubenson write that "both types of funding are disbursed by federal granting agencies [such as the Tri-Council bodies] on a competitive basis and awarded in accordance with federal criteria, which includes merit and national interests", observance of human rights and the general direction of state. "Furthermore, these policy decisions are set within a science and technology policy that emerged from competing definitions of science, utility, and the “public good”. At the policy level, the interests of capital are privileged under the guise of serving the national interest."

From 1993 to 1995, a single minister was styled as Minister of Industry while concurrently holding the posts of Industry, Science and Technology, and of Consumer and Corporate Affairs, pending a government restructuring. The post of Minister of Industry was formally created in 1995 under the direction of John Manley.

Since 2000
On 4 November 2015 the office was renamed to its current name in the 29th Canadian Ministry of Justin Trudeau.

List of ministers

Preceding offices 
Economic development, industry, science
 Minister of Trade and Commerce (1892–1969)
 Minister of Industry (1963–1969)
 Minister of Industry, Trade and Commerce (1969–1983)
 Minister of Regional Economic Expansion (1969–1983)
 Minister of Regional Industrial Expansion (1983–1990)
 Minister of Industry, Science and Technology (1990–1993) (legally merged in 1995)
 Minister of Science (2015-2019)
Corporate affairs
 Secretary of State for Canada (1867–1967)
 Minister of Consumer and Corporate Affairs (1967–1993) (legally merged in 1995)

Ministers 
Key

Critics
 Scott Brison March 2008 – November 2015

References

Minister of Industry (Canada)
Innovation
Canada
Industry ministers
Canada